Schoenfeld is a hamlet in Saskatchewan.

Unincorporated communities in Saskatchewan
Swift Current No. 137, Saskatchewan